Musical compositions of the Russian composer Sergei Taneyev (1856–1915)

Orchestral 
 Symphony (No. 1) in E minor (1873-4, published 1948) (edited by )
 Piano Concerto (1876, published 1957) in E flat (2 movements only. Completed by Pavel Lamm and Vissarion Shebalin)
 Symphony (No. 2) in B flat (unfinished - 3 movements only) (1877)
 Overture on Russian Themes in C (Song No. 10 from Rimsky-Korsakov's Song Collection, Op.24) (1882) (completed by Pavel Lamm, published in 1948) 
 Symphony (No. 3) in D minor (1884, published 1947)
 Oresteia, overture for orchestra, Op. 6 (1889, a symphonic poem based on themes from the opera)
 Symphony No. 4 in C minor, Op. 12 (1901) (the only numbered symphony Taneyev published)
 Concert Suite for violin & orchestra, Op. 28 (1909) (five movements: Prelude, Gavotte, Fairy Tale, Theme & Variations, Tarantella)

Chamber and instrumental music 
 String Trio in D major (1879/1880)
 Choral varié in A major for organ (1894?) 
 String Quintet No. 1 in G for 2 violins, viola and 2 cellos, Op. 14 (1900-1901) 
 String Quintet No. 2 in C for 2 violins, 2 violas and cello, Op. 16 (1904) 
 Piano Quartet in E major, Op. 20 (1906)
 String Trio in D for 2 violins and viola, Op. 21 (1907)
 Piano Trio in D for violin, cello and piano, Op. 22 (1908)
 Prelude and Fugue for piano in G minor, Op. 29 (1910)
 Prelude in F major (1894-1895)
 Piano Quintet in G minor, Op. 30 (1911)
 String Trio in E major for violin, viola and viola-tenore, Op. 31 (1911); Viola-tenore is pitched one octave below the violin.
 Violin Sonata in A minor (1911)
 String Trio in B minor (1913)

String quartets 
(in chronological order)
 String Quartet, D minor, 1874–6 (2 movements completed)
 String Quartet (No. 7), E flat, 1880
 String Quartet (No. 8), C, 1882–3
 String Quartet (No. 9), A, 1883
 String Quartet No. 1, B flat minor, Op. 4, 1890
 String Quartet No. 2, C, Op. 5, 1894–5
 String Quartet No. 3, D minor, Op. 7, 1886, rev. 1896
 String Quartet No. 4, A minor, Op. 11, 1898–9
 String Quartet No. 5, A, Op. 13, 1902–3
 String Quartet No. 6, B flat, Op. 19, 1903–5
 String Quartet, C minor, 1911 (2 movements only)

Choral 
 John of Damascus ("A Russian Requiem"), Op. 1, for 4 part mixed chorus and orchestra (1884)
 Choruses, Op. 35, to words by Konstantin Balmont 
 At the Reading of a Psalm, cantata, Op. 36 (1915)
about 25 collections of religious and folk choruses

Opera 
 Oresteia (opera), (1887–1894)

Vocal 
 10 Romances, Op. 17
 (more than 60 other songs)

External links 
 
  - Netherlands Radio Philharmonic Orchestra and Choir, cdr. Vasily Petrenko

References 
 David Brown, "Sergey Ivanovich Taneyev", Grove Music Online, ed. L. Macy (accessed February 10, 2006), grovemusic.com (subscription access).
 David Brown, Sergey Ivanovich Taneyev, in 'The New Grove Dictionary of Music and Musicians, ed. Stanley Sadie, 1980, 
 Sleeve notes, Complete String Quartets of Sergei Taneyev, 5 CDs, Northern Flowers, St. Petersburg 

Taneyev, Sergei